The Jackson River is a river of the southwestern South Island of New Zealand. It flows predominantly northeast, flowing into the Arawhata River close to the latter's outflow into Jackson Bay.

See also
List of rivers of New Zealand

References

Rivers of the West Coast, New Zealand
Westland District
Rivers of New Zealand